
Gmina Pionki is a rural gmina (administrative district) in Radom County, Masovian Voivodeship, in east-central Poland. Its seat is the town of Pionki, although the town is not part of the territory of the gmina.

Villages
Gmina Pionki contains the villages and settlements of Adolfin, Augustów, Bieliny, Brzezinki, Brzeziny, Czarna Wieś, Czarna-Kolonia, Działki Suskowolskie, Helenów, Huta, Januszno, Jaroszki, Jaśce, Jedlnia, Jedlnia-Kolonia, Kieszek, Kolonka, Krasna Dąbrowa, Laski, Marcelów, Mireń, Płachty, Poświętne, Sałki, Sokoły, Stoki, Sucha, Suskowola, Tadeuszów, Wincentów, Zadobrze, Zalesie and Żdżary.

Neighbouring gminas
Gmina Pionki is bordered by the gminas of Garbatka-Letnisko, Głowaczów, Gózd, Jastrzębia, Jedlnia-Letnisko, Kozienice, Policzna and Zwoleń.

References
Polish official population figures 2006

Pionki
Radom County